Helvibis is a genus of spiders in the family Theridiidae that was first described by Eugen von Keyserling in 1884. It is a senior synonym of Formicinoides.

Species
 it contains ten species, found in Trinidad, and from Panama to Brazil:
Helvibis brasiliana (Keyserling, 1884) – Peru
Helvibis chilensis (Keyserling, 1884) – Chile, Brazil
Helvibis germaini Simon, 1895 – Peru, Brazil
Helvibis infelix (O. Pickard-Cambridge, 1880) – Brazil
Helvibis longicauda Keyserling, 1891 – Brazil
Helvibis longistyla (F. O. Pickard-Cambridge, 1902) – Panama, Trinidad
Helvibis monticola Keyserling, 1891 – Brazil
Helvibis rossi Levi, 1964 – Peru
Helvibis thorelli Keyserling, 1884 (type) – Peru, Brazil
Helvibis tingo Levi, 1964 – Peru

See also
 List of Theridiidae species

References

Araneomorphae genera
Spiders of Central America
Spiders of South America
Taxa named by Eugen von Keyserling
Theridiidae